The sihu (known as a  /  / khuuchir in Mongolia, where this term defines the whole huqin family) is a Chinese bowed string instrument with four strings.  It is a member of the huqin family of instruments.

Construction
The instrument's name comes from the words sì (四, meaning "four" in Chinese, referring to the instrument's number of strings) and hú (胡, short for huqin, the family of instruments of which the sihu is a member).  Its soundbox and neck are made from hardwood and the playing end of the soundbox is covered with python, cow, or sheep skin.

There are several sizes of sihu; the lowest of these is generally tuned C, C, G, G; the medium size is tuned G, G, D, D; and the smallest size is tuned D, D, A, A.

Technique
The instrument is held vertically, with its soundbox on the player's lap, and its strings are tuned in pairs.  The hair of the bow passes between the two pairs of strings.

Use
The sihu is primarily associated with the Mongolian culture, and is played by Mongolians in Mongolia and also in the Inner Mongolia Autonomous Region of China. The Mongolians call it the Khuurchir. It is also used as a traditional instrument in the Liaoning, Jilin, Heilongjiang provinces of China.

It is also used as an accompanying instrument in various Chinese narrative genres, including Beijing dagu, plum blossom dagu, Xihe Dagu, Tianjin new tunes, Shandong qin shu, Northeast dagu, Hubei song, Shaoxing lianhua luo, Shanxi er ren, Inner Mongolia er ren, northeast dance duet, lucky play, Beijing opera derived drama from ballads, Hebei pi ying (shadow theater), and Henan erjiaxian traditional entertainment involving talking, singing, and drama. 

The sihu, often sometimes called the tiqin back then, was the premier folk instrument of the Qing Dynasty, used in both folk and court ensembles by Han, Mongol, and Manchu musicians, until Liu Tianhua brought the erhu to Beijing in the 1920s. Since then, the sihu has mostly fallen into obscurity, even among Mongols.

Similar instruments include the Mongolian dörvön chikhtei khuur (four eared fiddle) and the Tuvan byzaanchy. In China, dörbön chikhtei khuur (Chinese: 胡兀尔 or 都日奔齐和胡尔) is considered an alias of sihu.

See also
Huqin
Byzaanchy
Traditional Chinese musical instruments

External links
Sihu article
Sihu photo

Mongolian musical instruments
Chinese musical instruments
Drumhead lutes
Bowed instruments
Huqin family instruments